Tomenko is a Ukrainian surname. Notable people with the surname include:

 Mykola Tomenko (born 1964), Ukrainian politician
 Viktor Tomenko (born 1971), Russian politician

See also
 

Ukrainian-language surnames